The Henotikon ( or  in English; Greek  henōtikón "act of union") was a christological document issued by Byzantine emperor Zeno in 482, in an unsuccessful attempt to reconcile the differences between the supporters of the Council of Chalcedon and the council's opponents (Non-Chalcedonian Christians). It was followed by the Acacian schism.

In 451, the Council of Chalcedon settled christological disputes by condemning both Monophysitism, held by Eutyches, and Nestorianism. However, large sections of the Eastern Roman Empire, especially in Egypt, but also in Palestine and Syria, held miaphysite views. In order to restore unity, the Patriarch of Constantinople, Acacius, devised an eirenic formula, which Emperor Zeno promulgated without the approval of a synod of bishops. The Henotikon endorsed the condemnations of Eutyches and Nestorius made at Chalcedon and explicitly approved the twelve anathemas of Cyril of Alexandria, but avoided any definitive statement on whether Christ had one or two natures, attempting to appease both sides of the dispute.

This act failed to satisfy either side. All sides took offence at the Emperor openly dictating church doctrine, although the Patriarch of Antioch was pressured into subscribing to the Henotikon. When Patriarch John I of Alexandria refused, the Emperor had him expelled and instead recognized the Miaphysite Peter Mongos, who accepted the Henotikon. However, other miaphysites abandoned him and were thenceforth called Akephaloi (headless ones), since they had lost their leader. After two years of prevarication and temporizing by Acacius, Pope Felix III of Rome condemned the act and excommunicated Acacius (484), although this was largely ignored in Constantinople, even after the death of Acacius in 489.

Zeno died in 491. His successor Anastasius I was sympathetic to the monophysites, and accepted the Henotikon. However, Anastasius's position was at odds with the predominantly Chalcedonian population of Constantinople, and Vitalian, a Chalcedonian general, attempted to overthrow him in 514. Anastasius then attempted to heal the schism with Pope Hormisdas, but this failed when Anastasius refused to recognize the excommunication of the now deceased Acacius. Vitalian tried to overthrow the emperor a second time, but he was defeated by loyal officers.

The schism caused by the Henotikon was officially settled in 519 when Emperor Justin I recognized the excommunication of Acacius and reunited the churches. However, the then-Patriarchs of Alexandria and Antioch still embraced miaphysitism, and their congregations came to be known in modern times as the Oriental Orthodox Churches. Meanwhile, the incident did nothing to mend the growing rift between the churches of Constantinople and Rome, which would lead in the centuries to come to the East-West Schism.

See also

Christology
Hypostatic union

References

Bibliography

External links
Catholic Encyclopedia: Henoticon
 Edward Walford, translator, The Ecclesiastical History of Evagrius: A History of the Church from AD 431 to AD 594, 1846. Reprinted 2008. Evolution Publishing  – contains a complete English translation of the Henotikon.
 The Henoticon (Instrument of Union) (tertullian.org)

Christianity in the Byzantine Empire
House of Leo
Oriental Orthodoxy
482
5th-century Christianity
Christian terminology
5th century in the Byzantine Empire
